Io is a pure object-oriented programming language inspired by Smalltalk, Self, Lua, Lisp, Act1, and NewtonScript. Io has a prototype-based object model similar to the ones in Self and NewtonScript, eliminating the distinction between instance and class. Like Smalltalk, everything is an object and it uses dynamic typing. Like Lisp, programs are just data trees. Io uses actors for concurrency.

Remarkable features of Io are its minimal size and openness to using external code resources.  Io is executed by a small, portable virtual machine.

History 
The language was created by Steve Dekorte in 2002, after trying to help a friend, Dru Nelson, with his language, Cel. He found out that he really didn't know much about how languages worked, and set out to write a tiny language to understand the problems better.

Philosophy 
Io's goal is to explore conceptual unification and dynamic languages, so the tradeoffs tend to favor simplicity and flexibility over performance.

Features 
 Pure object-oriented based on prototypes
 Code-as-data / homoiconic 
 Lazy evaluation of function parameters
 Higher-order functions
 Introspection, reflection and metaprogramming
 Actor-based concurrency
 Coroutines
 Exception handling
 Incremental garbage collecting supporting weak links
 Highly portable
 DLL/shared library dynamic loading on most platforms
 Small virtual machine

Syntax 

In its simplest form, it is composed of a single identifier:

 doStuff

Assuming the above doStuff is a method, it is being called with zero arguments and as a result, explicit parentheses are not required.

If doStuff had arguments, it would look like this:

 doStuff(42)

Io is a message passing language, and since everything in Io is a message (excluding comments), each message is sent to a receiver. The above example demonstrates this well, but not fully. To describe this point better, let's look at the next example:

 System version

The above example demonstrates message passing in Io; the "version" message is sent to the "System" object.

Operators are a special case where the syntax is not as cut-and-dried as the above examples. The Io parser intercepts a set of operators defined by the interpreter, and translates them to method calls. For example, the following:

 1 + 5 * 8 + 1

translates to:

 1 +(5 *(8)) +(1)

All operators in Io are methods; the fact that they do not require explicit parentheses is a convenience. As you can see, there is also a little bit of operator precedence happening here, and the precedence levels are the same as with the C precedence levels.

Methods and blocks 
In Io there are two ways of creating anonymous functions: methods and blocks. Between them, they are almost identical except for scope. While blocks have lexical scope, methods have dynamic scope.

Both method and block are higher-order functions.

Examples 
The ubiquitous Hello world program:

 "Hello, world!" println

New objects are created by cloning objects. In Io specifically, a new, empty object is created and only the differences between it and its parent are stored within the new object; this behavior is known as differential inheritance. An example of this behavior is shown:

 A := Object clone         // creates a new, empty object named "A"

A simple non-recursive factorial function, in Io:

factorial := method(n,
    if(n == 0, return 1)
    res := 1
    Range 1 to(n) foreach(i, res = res * i)
)

Because assignment of res * i to res is the last action taken, the function implicitly returns the result and so an explicit return expression is not needed. The above demonstrates the usage of ranges, and doesn't use a for() loop, which would be faster.

See also 
 Ioke (programming language)

References

External links 
 Io home page
 Io at Synrc Research Center
 
 Jasmine.Io BDD Testing Framework for Io

Programming languages
Dynamic programming languages
Dynamically typed programming languages
Prototype-based programming languages
Object-oriented programming languages
Programming languages created in 2002
Scripting languages
2002 software
Homoiconic programming languages